Charles Elwood Brown (July 4, 1834 – May 22, 1904) was a U.S. Representative from Ohio.

Born in Cincinnati, Ohio, Brown attended the common schools and Greenfield Academy, He was graduated from Miami University, Oxford, Ohio, in 1854.
He went south and, while serving as tutor at Baton Rouge, Louisiana, studied law.
He was admitted to the bar in 1859 and commenced practice in Chillicothe, Ohio.
He served as prosecuting attorney of Ross County in 1859 and 1860.
In the first year of the American Civil War, Brown enlisted as a private in Company B, Sixty-third Regiment, Ohio Volunteers, September 2, 1861. He was promptly commissioned as a captain on October 23, 1861.
Brown lost his left leg on July 22, 1864 in the Atlanta Campaign.
He was promoted through the ranks to colonel June 6, 1865.
Brown was mustered out of the volunteers on July 8, 1865. In recognition of Brown's service and sacrifice in the Atlanta Campaign, on January 13, 1866, President Andrew Johnson nominated him for appointment to the grade of brevet brigadier general to rank from March 13, 1865, and the U.S. Senate confirmed the appointment on March 12, 1866.

After the Civil War, Brown resumed the practice of law in Chillicothe, Ohio.
He served as postmaster of Chillicothe, 1866–1872.
He was commissioned pension agent at Cincinnati in 1872, and held this position until President Hayes' administration began in 1877.

Brown was elected as a Republican to the Forty-ninth and Fiftieth U.S. Congresses (March 4, 1885 – March 3, 1889).
He was not a candidate for renomination in 1888 and resumed the practice of law.
He served as member of the State senate in 1900 and 1901.

Charles Elwood Brown died at College Hill, Ohio, on May 22, 1904.
He was interred in Spring Grove Cemetery, Cincinnati, Ohio.

References

Further reading

1834 births
1904 deaths
Republican Party members of the United States House of Representatives from Ohio
Politicians from Cincinnati
Ohio lawyers
Burials at Spring Grove Cemetery
Miami University alumni
County district attorneys in Ohio
Union Army generals
People of Ohio in the American Civil War
Republican Party Ohio state senators
Politicians from Chillicothe, Ohio
American amputees
Ohio postmasters
19th-century American politicians